William Edward Glyn (1859 – March 23, 1939) was an American based British male tennis player.

William Glyn from the Staten Island Cricket and B.B. Club was a finalist in the first U.S. National Championships held in 1881 at the Newport Lawn Tennis Club in Newport, Rhode Island.  En route to the final, he defeated Mr. Rives, Richard Field Conover, W. Gammell Jr., and T. A. Shaw. In the final he met and was defeated by Richard D. Sears.

Grand Slam finals

Singles (1 runner-up)

References

Sources

British male tennis players
Tennis people from New York (state)
Place of birth missing
1859 births
1939 deaths